Still Crazy Like a Fox (also known as Crazy Like a Fox: The Movie) is a 1987 American made-for-television thriller drama film based on the 1984–1986 television series Crazy Like a Fox, which reunited Jack Warden and John Rubinstein as a father and son team of private detectives. It was directed by Paul Krasny and is most noted for the appearance of Monty Python's Graham Chapman in a rare straight role as a Detective Inspector. The film originally aired on CBS on April 5, 1987.

After the cancellation of the original series, it enjoyed a second life in syndicated reruns and the film was greenlit by CBS in an attempt to gauge potential audience interest in reviving the series. While the film pulled fairly solid numbers, it was ultimately decided that the ratings were not high enough to move forward with a new series, and plans to do so were scrapped. However, the film was later split into two parts and added to the Crazy Like a Fox syndication package.

Plot 
During a vacation in the United Kingdom, Harrison "Harry" Fox, Sr. (Jack Warden) and Harrison Fox, Jr. (John Rubinstein) inadvertently become the prime suspects in a murder case, and must go on the run in the British countryside with the whole of the police force on their trail.

Cast 
 Jack Warden as Harrison Joshua "Harry" Fox, Sr.
 John Rubinstein as Harrison Joshua Fox, Jr.
 Penny Peyser as Cindy Fox
 Robby Kiger as Harrison Joshua "Josh" Fox III
 Graham Chapman as Detective Inspector Palmer
 James Faulkner as the Duke of Trent
 Michael Jayston as Randall Perry
 Rosemary Leach as Eleanor Trundle
 Catherine Oxenberg as Nancy
 Colin Stinton as Thurmond Richards
 Moray Watson as Hubbard
 John Moffatt as Milton
 Maxine Howe as Roberta Bick
 Matt Zimmerman as Donald Bick
 Allan Cuthbertson as Monty Clayton
 John Cater as Rockhill

References

External links 
 

1987 television films
1987 films
1980s thriller drama films
American thriller television films
American drama television films
American detective films
American police detective films
Television series reunion films
CBS network films
Films scored by Mark Snow
Films based on television series
Films set in England
Films shot in England
Films directed by Paul Krasny
1980s American films